The 2014 Purdue Boilermakers football team was an American football team that represented Purdue University during the 2014 NCAA Division I FBS football season. The Boilermakers played in the new West Division of the Big Ten Conference and played their home games at Ross–Ade Stadium in West Lafayette, Indiana. The team was led by head coach Darrell Hazell, who was in his second season at Purdue. Purdue finished the season with a record of 3–9, 1–7 in Big Ten play to finish in last place in the West Division. This marked the first time since 1993 that Purdue finished with the worst record in the Big Ten in back-to-back seasons.

Preseason
The 2013 team compiled a 1–11 record under first-year head coach Darrell Hazell.

Hazell announced that the quarterback position was an open battle prior to spring practice, notably including sophomore Danny Etling, red-shirt sophomore Austin Appleby and true freshman David Blough. On August 18, 2014, Hazell named Etling the starting quarterback.

Transfers in
Ian MacDougall transferred from Wabash College to pursue his master's degree and placekick.

Parker Flynn, a former Arizona State walk-on kicker, transferred to Purdue.

Transfers out
In January, linebacker Armstead Williams transferred to Duquesne.

Tight End, Ryan Morris transferred to Villanova.

In May, running back Dalyn Dawkins transferred from Purdue to Colorado State.

In July, linebacker Ruben Ibarra transferred to Arizona State.

Quarterback Erich Berzinskas and wide receiver Aloyis Gray transferred to Arizona Western College.

Recruiting

Position key

Recruits
Purdue's recruiting class was ranked No. 68 by Scout No. 72 by Rivals and No. 69 by ESPN. The program received 18 letters of intent on National Signing Day, February 5, 2013. Almost 3 weeks after NSD, Purdue signed David Hedelin, a junior college transfer, who had to sit out the first 3 games of the season due to playing professionally in Sweden for 2 seasons. Kicker Austin McGehee enrolled at Purdue, but transferred in late July to Arkansas State. Also in late July, Darrell Hazell announced that Juan Jenkins would not likely make it to campus due to academic issues.

Schedule

Schedule Source:

Game summaries

vs. Western Michigan

Sources:

vs. Central Michigan

Sources:

Depth chart
Starters and backups against for the final game of the season.

Roster

References

Purdue
Purdue Boilermakers football seasons
Purdue Boilermakers football